Jarrow Football Club is a football club based in Jarrow, Tyne and Wear, England.

History
The original Jarrow club were formed in 1894 after Jarrow Rangers folded. Having initially been accepted into the Tyneside League, the new club successfully applied to join the Northern Alliance for the 1894–95 season. Their first match on 22 August was a friendly against Bill Quay Albion, with Jarrow winning 3–0. The club were Northern Alliance runners-up in 1897–98 and won the league the following season, also reaching the first round of the FA Cup; drawn away to First Division club Everton, they lost 3–1. In 1899–1900 they reached the first round again, losing 2–0 at home to Millwall Athletic in front of a crowd that reached 8,000. The season also saw them win the Durham Challenge Cup, beating Sunderland 'A' 1–0 in the final. Having turned amateur in 1901, Jarrow left the Northern Alliance at the end of the 1901–02 season and subsequently disbanded. Although the club was reformed and rejoined the Northern Alliance in 1903, they resigned from the league in March 1909 with their record expunged.

At the start of the following season a club named Jarrow Croft joined the North Eastern League. Croft had previously played in the South Shields Junior League and the Northern Amateur League, before winning the Newcastle Amateur League in 1909–10. The club were renamed Jarrow in 1912, and for the first two years of World War I they played in the North Eastern League–Tyneside Combination. After the war the club were renamed Palmers Jarrow, before reverting to simply Jarrow in March 1920. They finished bottom of the North Eastern League in 1923–24, and moved to Campbell Park in  Hebburn the following season; plans to rename themselves Jarrow and Hebburn were dropped after the Durham FA refused permission. In 1930–31 another FA Cup first round appearance ended in a 1–0 defeat at Third Division North club Crewe Alexandra.

Jarrow won the Durham Challenge Cup for a second time in 1932–33, beating Spennymoor United 2–1 in the final. They retained the trophy the following season with a 1–0 win over Cockfield in the final and were also North Eastern League runners-up. The loss of their Campbell Park ground to the army in March 1939 led to the club resigning from the league at the end of the 1938–39 season. After World War II Jarrow rejoined the Northern Alliance, but they withdrew from the league during the 1948–49 season after 23 matches. They dropped into the Northern Combination and subsequently disappeared.

The club was reformed in 1980. They joined Division Two of the Wearside League in 1991 and a third-place finish in 1992–93 saw them promoted to Division One. However, they finished bottom of Division One the following season and were relegated back to Division Two. The league was reduced to a single division in 1996 and the club finished bottom of the league in 1996–97. A second division was readded in 1998 and Jarrow finished bottom of Division One in 1999–2000, but avoided relegation as the league was reduced to a single division again. In 2007–08 Jarrow were Wearside League runners-up. They won the league in 2016–17, earning promotion to Division Two of the Northern League.

Ground
The original Jarrow initially played at a cycle track at Monkton, which had been opened by Jarrow Amateur Bicycling Club in 1891. The ground became known as the Monkton Stadium and was taken over by the Jarrow Cycling, Athletic and Football Ground Company Limited in 1896. Jarrow Croft played at Simonside, before moving to Jarrow Caledonian's Curlew Road ground in 1913. In the early 1920s the club built a new 15,000-capacity ground in nearby Hebburn named Campbell Park, with the first match played there on 1 September 1924, a 1–1 draw with Newcastle United. In 1939 the ground was commandeered by the army for conversion into a drill hall for the 87th Anti-Aircraft Regiment. After the war the club returned to the Monkston Stadium.

Honours
Wearside League
Champions 2016–17
Northern Alliance
Champions 1898–99
Durham Challenge Cup
Winners 1899–1900, 1932–33, 1933–34

Records
Best FA Cup performance: First round, 1898–99, 1899–1900, 1930–31

See also
Jarrow F.C. players
Jarrow F.C. managers

References

External links
Official website

 
Football clubs in England
Football clubs in Tyne and Wear
Sport in Jarrow
1894 establishments in England
Association football clubs established in 1894
Northern Football Alliance
North Eastern League
Wearside Football League
Northern Football League